Kreta Ayer Single Member Constituency was a constituency spanning Chinatown and Raffles Place in Singapore. It used to exist from 1959 to 1988 as Kreta Ayer Constituency and was renamed as Kreta Ayer Single Member Constituency (SMC) as part of Singapore's political reforms. The SMC was merged into Kreta Ayer–Tanglin Group Representation Constituency in 1997.

Member of Parliament

Elections

Elections in the 1950s

References
1959 GE's result
1963 GE's result
1968 GE's result
1972 GE's result
1976 GE's result
1980 GE's result
1984 GE's result
1988 GE's result
1991 GE's result

Subdivisions of Singapore